KMXQ (92.9 FM) is a radio station broadcasting a classic rock music format. Licensed to Socorro, New Mexico, United States, the station is currently owned by Cochise Media Licenses LLC.

References

External links

Classic rock radio stations in the United States
MXQ